François-Louis Dejuinne (1786–1844) was a French painter. He was born in Paris in 1786, and learned the art of painting under Girodet. He visited Rome, where he studied the works of Titian, Paolo Veronese, and other great masters. He died in Paris in 1844. His paintings were mostly historical; among them are the
'Ascension of the Virgin ' and 'St. Geneviève ' for Notre-Dame de Lorette, and 'The Four Seasons' for the Trianon Palace.

References

Attribution:

External links

1786 births
1844 deaths
18th-century French painters
French male painters
19th-century French painters
Painters from Paris
19th-century French male artists
18th-century French male artists